Napoleon's Daughter (German: Die Tochter Napoleons) is a 1922 German silent historical film directed by Frederic Zelnik and starring Lya Mara, Ludwig Hartau and Ernst Hofmann. It premiered at the Marmorhaus in Berlin.

The film's sets were designed by the art director Fritz Lederer.

Cast
Lya Mara as Marion  
Ludwig Hartau as Napoleon
Ernst Hofmann as Armand  
Charles Willy Kayser as Colonna  
Gertrud de Lalsky as Madame de Marly  
Georg di Georgetti as Granvila  
Albert Patry as Charamont  
Heinrich Peer as Fouché
Georg H. Schnell as Bertin  
Magnus Stifter as Brissac  
Else Wasa as Desirée  
Kurt Wolowsky as Léon

References

External links

Films of the Weimar Republic
Films set in the 19th century
Films set in France
German historical films
1920s historical films
Films directed by Frederic Zelnik
German silent feature films
Depictions of Napoleon on film
German black-and-white films
1920s German films